Century Park station may refer to:

Century Park station (Edmonton), a light rail station in Canada
Century Park station (Shanghai Metro), a metro station in China